Open City is a 2008 South Korean film.

Plot 
Jo Dae-yeong is a police officer investigating a pickpocket ring with ties to the Japanese crime syndicate, Yakuza. One day he rescues Baek Jang-mi from danger, only to discover that she is the boss of the gang he has been tracking.

Cast 
 Kim Myung-min ... Jo Dae-yeong
 Son Ye-jin ... Baek Jang-mi
 Kim Hae-sook ... Kang Man-ok
 Son Byong-ho ... Oh Yeon-soo
 Shim Ji-ho ... Choi Seong-soo
 Yoon Yoo-sun ... Jo Soo-hyeon
 Kim Byeong-ok ... Hong Ki-taek/Hong Yong-taek
 Ji Dae-han ... Kim Kwang-seob
 Park Gil-soo ... Son Yong-soo
 Do Gi-seok ... Lee Won-jong
 Kim Joon-bae ... Franken

Release 
Open City was released in South Korea on 10 January 2008, and on its opening weekend was ranked second at the box office with 449,669 admissions.

References

External links 
 
 
 

2008 films
2000s crime action films
South Korean crime action films
Police detective films
Yakuza films
South Korean neo-noir films
Films about organized crime in South Korea
Films set in Seoul
Films set in Japan
CJ Entertainment films
2000s Korean-language films
2000s Japanese films
2000s South Korean films